Watercolors is Pat Metheny's second album, released in 1977.

The AllMusic review by Richard S. Ginell awards the album 4 stars and states: "Metheny's softly focused, asymmetrical guitar style, with echoes of apparent influences as disparate as Jim Hall, George Benson, Jerry Garcia, and various country guitarists, is quite distinctive even at this early juncture. Metheny's long-running partnership with keyboardist Lyle Mays also begins here, with Mays mostly on acoustic piano but also providing a few mild synthesizer washes."

Track listing

Personnel
 Pat Metheny – 6-and 12-string electric guitar, 15 string harp guitar
 Lyle Mays – piano, occasional synthesizer
 Eberhard Weber – double bass
 Danny Gottlieb – drums

Charts
Album – Billboard

References

Pat Metheny albums
1977 albums
ECM Records albums
Albums produced by Manfred Eicher